Santa Claus: The Movie is a 1985 Christmas film starring Dudley Moore, John Lithgow, and David Huddleston. It depicts the origin of Santa Claus (played by Huddleston), and his modern-day adventure to save one of his elves (Moore) who has been manipulated by an unscrupulous toy company executive (Lithgow). It was directed by Jeannot Szwarc and was the last major fantasy film produced by the Paris-based father-and-son production team of Alexander and Ilya Salkind.

Released in North America by TriStar Pictures on November 27, 1985, Santa Claus: The Movie was a box office bomb and received mostly negative reviews from critics.

Plot
In the Middle Ages, a woodcutter named Claus delivers hand-carved toys to the children of his village each Christmas, accompanied by his wife Anya and their reindeer Donner and Blitzen. Caught in a blizzard, they are saved by elves and taken to their magical workshop at the North Pole. Lead elf Dooley explains that their coming was prophesied; that it is Claus' destiny to deliver the toys made by the elves to the children of the world; and that they, like the elves, will live forever. The following Christmas Eve, the oldest elf dubs Claus "Santa Claus" and explains that the night will last as long as it takes for him to deliver toys to every child on Earth. Donner and Blitzen join six other reindeer and are fed hay sprinkled with magical powder that enables them to fly, pulling Santa's sleigh through the air. As the centuries pass, much of the mythology and traditions surrounding Santa Claus develop.

By the late 20th century Santa is exhausted by his ever-growing workload, and Anya suggests that he enlist an assistant. Two elves compete for the position: Puffy, who follows traditional toymaking methods, and Patch, who has many ideas for modernization. Patch wins by designing a machine to increase production through automation, but unbeknownst to him it begins to malfunction and produce shoddy toys. In New York City Santa befriends homeless orphan boy Joe and takes him for a ride in his sleigh. They unsuccessfully attempt the "Super Duper Looper", a vertical loop maneuver which always fails due to Donner's acrophobia. They also meet wealthy orphan girl Cornelia, who befriends Joe.

When the toys produced by Patch's machine fall apart on Christmas Day, he resigns in disgrace and leaves the North Pole, winding up in New York City. Meanwhile, the B.Z. Toy Company, run by Cornelia's unscrupulous step-uncle B.Z., is facing shutdown by the government for producing unsafe toys. Seeing the company's toys being pulled from a storefront, Patch mistakenly thinks they are very popular and approaches B.Z. about a job. Hoping to redeem himself in Santa's eyes, he creates lollipops laced with the magic powder that allows the reindeer to fly, and a flying car which he uses to deliver them to the world's children on Christmas Eve. The lollipops allow people to fly, making them an instant sensation and leaving Santa feeling obsolete and disheartened. B.Z. convinces Patch to strengthen the formula and put it in candy canes, planning to launch his own holiday called "Christmas 2" in late March.

Cornelia and Joe overhear B.Z. plotting to oust Santa as the figurehead of Christmas, and Joe is captured. Cornelia further overhears B.Z.'s assistant, Towzer, share his discovery that the candy canes explode when exposed to heat. B.Z. plans to take Towzer and their money and flee to Brazil, letting Patch take the fall for their dangerous product. Cornelia writes to Santa, who rushes to help despite two of his reindeer being sidelined by illness. Patch finds Joe tied up in the toy factory and frees him. Seeing a wood carving resembling Patch that Santa made for Joe, Patch realizes that Santa misses him. He and Joe take off for the North Pole in his flying car with the candy canes loaded in the trunk, unaware that they are becoming unstable. Santa and Cornelia pursue in Santa's sleigh; as the car explodes, they successfully perform the Super Duper Looper, saving Joe and Patch. The police, alerted by Cornelia, attempt to arrest B.Z., but he eats several of the magic candy canes and jumps out a window, only to float upward uncontrollably.

Santa agrees to let Joe and Cornelia stay at his workshop until next Christmas. As they celebrate with the elves, B.Z. floats off into space.

Cast
 Dudley Moore as Patch
 John Lithgow as B.Z.
 David Huddleston as Claus/Santa Claus
 Burgess Meredith as the Ancient Elf
 Judy Cornwell as Anya
 Jeffrey Kramer as Towzer
 Christian L Fitzpatrick as Joe
 Carrie Kei Heim as Cornelia
 John Barrard as Dooley
 Anthony O'Donnell as Puffy
 Aimee Delamain as a storyteller in Claus' village
 Dorothea Phillips as Miss Tucker, Cornelia's nanny
 John Hallam as Grizzard, B.Z.'s chauffeur
 Judith Morse as Miss Abruzzi, who works for B.Z.
 Jerry Harte as a Senate Chairman
 Ian Wise as Salvation Army Bandsman (Central Park Scene)
Additional elves were played by Melvyn Hayes, Don Estelle, Tim Stern, Peter O'Farrell, and Christopher Ryan as Goober, Groot, Boog, Honka, Vout, and Goobler, respectively. Other minor roles were played by Paul Aspland, Sally Granfield, and Michael Drew as reporters; Walter Goodman as a street corner Santa; John Cassady as a wino; and Ronald Fernee and Michael Ross as policemen.

Production

Development
Conceived by Ilya Salkind in the wake of the apparently waning critical and U.S. box office success of 1983's Superman III and its immediate follow-up, 1984's Supergirl, Santa Claus: The Movie was directed by Supergirl director Jeannot Szwarc, from a story by David and Leslie Newman (though David Newman took sole screenplay credit). Pierre Spengler, Ilya's longtime partner and a longtime collaborator of the Salkinds', joined Ilya as the project's producer.

John Carpenter was originally offered the chance to direct, but also wanted a say in the writing, musical score, and final cut of the film. Carpenter's original choice for the role of Santa was Brian Dennehy. Szwarc, however, felt that he needed an actor with more warmth than Dennehy. Lewis Gilbert was another early choice for director but, despite initial interest, he could not agree with the Salkinds over certain aspects of the script. Robert Wise was also offered the chance to direct, but had a different approach to the story. Guy Hamilton, who'd had to withdraw from directing Superman: The Movie in 1976, lobbied hard for the chance to direct the film, but only on the condition that it be shot either in Los Angeles, Vancouver, or Rome. Ultimately, the Salkinds chose Szwarc because of their excellent working relationship on Supergirl.

Casting
Dudley Moore was the Salkinds' top choice to play the lead elf in the film, Ilya Salkind having remembered a scene in Arthur in which Liza Minnelli's character asks Moore if he is Santa's Little Helper. Moore was attached to the project early on, and had a say in both scripting and choice of director. David Newman's first script draft named Moore's character Ollie, but Moore decided that the name should be changed to Patch, which was the nickname of his young son, Patrick. Moore had briefly been considered to play the role of Mister Mxyzptlk in the Salkinds' aborted original script for Superman III, and for the role of Nigel in Supergirl. He turned down that role, but suggested his longtime friend and comic partner Peter Cook for the part.

Ilya Salkind wanted an American actor to portray Santa Claus because he felt that the film focused on a primary piece of Americana in much the same way that Superman: The Movie had. Szwarc screen-tested such actors as David White (who, being in his late 60s, was considered too old for the role) and Moore's Arthur co-star Barney Martin. For a while, Ilya Salkind actively pursued Carroll O'Connor for the role before Szwarc showed him David Huddleston's screen-test, which won Salkind over.

For the role of B.Z., the producers wanted a star with a similar stature to Gene Hackman when he had played Lex Luthor in Superman: The Movie. To this end, they offered the role to Harrison Ford who turned them down. They made offers to Dustin Hoffman, Burt Reynolds and Johnny Carson, each of whom also turned the part down. Eventually, John Lithgow was settled on after Ilya Salkind watched Terms of Endearment and realized that he had a Grinch-type look to him.

The role of the Ancient Elf was written with James Cagney in mind. Though he liked the film's overall idea, Cagney, at 84, turned the role down due to being too weakened by age to perform it. Fred Astaire was considered, but when this eventually came to nothing Dudley Moore suggested his friend Burgess Meredith for the role, which he in the end won. At the time of the film's announcement in mid-1983, the British Press carried reports that diminutive actors such as David Jason, Patrick Troughton and Norman Wisdom would be cast alongside Moore as fellow elves, but none of them were.

Filming
Santa Claus: The Movie was filmed in Buckinghamshire, England at Pinewood Studios, between August and November 1984. The film was photographed by Arthur Ibbetson, whose credits included Willy Wonka & the Chocolate Factory (1971). Santa Claus: The Movie was his final feature film. Serving as film editor was Peter Hollywood. The production was designed by Anthony Pratt, with costume design concepts by Bob Ringwood. The visual effects unit, as well as several of the production staff, were Salkind stalwarts from the Superman films: Derek Meddings, director of visual and miniature effects; Roy Field, optical visual effects supervisor; and David Lane, flying and second unit director.

Reception
Santa Claus: The Movie received negative reviews upon release, with a rating of 20% on Rotten Tomatoes, from the 20 reviews counted. Box Office Mojo lists the film's total United States box office gross as $23,717,291, less than its $30–50 million production budget. It was very popular in the UK, grossing £5,073,000.

Chicago Sun-Times critic Roger Ebert noted some positive points to the film, writing that the film "does an interesting job of visualizing Santa's workshop" and Santa's elves. He also praised the film's special effects, particularly the New York City fly-over sequence involving Santa. Ebert also had some praise for Lithgow's "nice, hateful performance", but wrote that "the villain is not drawn big enough." He ceded that young children would probably like most of the film, but that older children and adults are "likely to find a lot of it a little thin."

Vincent Canby of The New York Times was less positive than Ebert, calling the production "elaborate and tacky". He described the film as having "the manner of a listless musical without any production numbers". Unlike Ebert, he offered little praise for the film's production design. Canby quipped that "Santa's workshop must be the world's largest purchaser of low-grade plywood" and that the flyover sequences with Santa "aren't great." The only praise he had for the film's acting was for John Lithgow, who Canby wrote "(gave) the film's only remotely stylish performance." A more recent review by William Mager for the BBC echoed Canby and Ebert's comments.

In his book Have Yourself a Movie Little Christmas, critic Alonso Duralde lists Santa Claus: The Movie in his chapter of worst Christmas films ever. His reasons include weak plot, garish production design, blatant product placement (particularly for McDonald's, though Coke and Pabst Blue Ribbon are also prominent), and scenery-chewing overacting on the part of Lithgow. Duralde ultimately concludes that the film is "a train-wreck of a Christmas film that's so very wrong that you won't be able to tear yourself away from it."

John Lithgow, in a 2019 interview, said, "It's just one of the tackiest movies I've ever been in. It seemed cheesy and it certainly never stuck...except in England. It is huge over there. I wish I had a nickel for every Englishman who's told me [it's their favorite film]. In England, that's half of what I'm known for."

Soundtrack

The soundtrack score was composed and conducted by Henry Mancini, composer of the themes from The Pink Panther and Peter Gunn, with veteran lyricist and screenwriter Leslie Bricusse contributing five original songs. The song "It's Christmas (All Over the World)" was written by Bill House and John Hobbs with Freddie Mercury in mind. While it is known that Mercury recorded a demo for the House/Hobbs song at Pinewood Studios, he was never to make a full commitment to the project, as he and his Queen bandmates had already committed themselves to the Highlander soundtrack. In the end, Mercury turned down the project, stating that he felt that Queen had become overcrowded with requests to work on film soundtracks; as a result, Sheena Easton was ultimately chosen to record the tune. As mentioned on the DVD commentary of the film by Jeannot Szwarc, Paul McCartney was asked to compose songs for the film. It is unknown why he did not do so in the end.

Track listing
 "Main Title: Every Christmas Eve 1 and Santa's Theme (Giving)" (Mancini/Bricusse)
 "Arrival of the Elves" (Mancini)
 "Making Toys" (Mancini/Bricusse)2
 "Christmas Rhapsody: Deck the Halls/Joy to the World/Hark! The Herald Angels Sing/12 Days of Christmas/O Tannenbaum/The First Noel/Silent Night"
 "It's Christmas Again" (Mancini/Bricusse)2
 "March of the Elves" (Mancini)
 "Patch, Natch!" (Mancini/Bricusse) 3
 "It's Christmas (All Over The World)" (Bill House, John Hobbs)5
 "Shouldn't Do That" (Nick Beggs, Stuart Croxford, Neal Askew, Steve Askew) 4
 "Sleigh Ride over Manhattan" (Mancini)
 "Sad Patch" (Mancini)
 "Patch Versus Santa" (Mancini)
 "Thank You, Santa" (Mancini/Bricusse) 2

1Sung by Aled Jones
2Performed by the Ambrosian Children's Choir. 
3Performed by the Ambrosian Singers
4Produced by Ken Scott and performed by Kaja
5Produced by Keith Olsen for Pogologo Corporation, and performed by Sheena Easton.

The soundtrack was originally released on record and cassette by EMI America Records in 1985. Soon after, it went out of print and remained unavailable until 2009 when it was released on CD as a limited run of 1000 copies which sold out immediately upon release. This production suffered from several issues, most notably a master which had been subjected to heavy noise reduction resulting in a loss of sound quality. Additionally, the left & right channels had been erroneously flipped, a superficial re-edit had been performed on "It's Christmas (All Over the World)", and the song "Shouldn't Do That" by Kaja (Kajagoogoo) had been omitted due to licensing issues. In 2012 a deluxe three-disc set, including remastered tracks, outtakes and alternate versions and a 32-page booklet, was released.

Comic book adaptation
Marvel Comics published a comic book adaptation of the film by writer Sid Jacobson and artist Frank Springer in Marvel Super Special #39.

See also
 Santa Claus in film
 List of Christmas films

References

External links

 
 
 
 

1985 films
1980s adventure films
American adventure films
American Christmas films
American children's adventure films
American fantasy films
British adventure films
British Christmas films
British fantasy films
Films directed by Jeannot Szwarc
American children's films
British children's films
British children's adventure films
Santa Claus in film
TriStar Pictures films
Films set in New York City
Films shot at Pinewood Studios
Films with screenplays by David Newman (screenwriter)
Films scored by Henry Mancini
Films adapted into comics
1980s children's films
1980s Christmas films
Films produced by Pierre Spengler
1980s English-language films
1980s American films
1980s British films